Ntazana "Taz" Mayembe (born 5 April 2003) is a professional footballer who plays as a winger. Born in Wales, he represents the Zambia national team.

Career
Mayembe joined the youth academy of Cardiff City at the age of 10. In January 2020, he signed his first professional contract with Cardiff. He made the bench for Cardiff City for the first time on 29 January 2020. On June 10, 2022, Cardiff announced Mayembe would be leaving the club on June 30 when his contract expired.

International career
Born in Wales, Mayembe is of Zambian descent. He has been called up to represent both England and Wales at schoolboy level. Mayembe debuted for the Zambia national team in a friendly 3–1 loss to Senegal on 5 June 2021.

References

External links

2003 births
Living people
Footballers from Bridgend
Zambian footballers
Zambia international footballers
Welsh footballers
Welsh people of Zambian descent
Cardiff City F.C. players
Association football wingers